Per Asbjørn Pedersen Tjøstland (27 February 1918 in Fister, Rogaland - 14 December 2004 in Stavanger), né Per Asbjørn Pedersen, was a Norwegian Nazi activist and SS volunteer. As editor of the Norwegian SS newspaper Germaneren, he belonged to the radical and anti-capitalist wing of Nazism, and was a proponent of "a total revolution" and racial war.

SS volunteer

In 1941, he was among the first Norwegians to volunteer for service with the SS, where he held the rank of Rottenführer, and by his own admission took part in massacres of Jews on the Eastern Front.

Nazi writer and editor in Norway

After returning to Norway in 1943, he became deputy editor and then, in 1944, editor of the newspaper Germaneren, the official publication of Germanske SS Norge. Tjøstland belonged to a radical and anti-capitalistic Nazi faction that supported Pan-Germanism. His newspaper was, to the extent permitted by the circumstances, openly critical of the ruling Norwegian fascist party Nasjonal Samling for not being supportive of Pan-Germanism, for not being radical enough, for only being lukewarm Nazis, for its perceived corruption and infiltration by people motivated by opportunism rather than conviction, and for being more concerned with Norwegian national interests than Nazism. Tjøstland was a supporter of a "total revolution" and racial war. He chastised "false National Socialists" who "declared themselves to be National Socialists in order to destroy National Socialism." He adopted the name Tjøstland in 1943.

Prison
In 1946, he was sentenced to five years of forced labour for treason, and was released from prison in 1949.

Family and legacy
He had six children and 20 grandchildren. In 2014, his granddaughter Ida Jackson (née Tjøstland Søland) published the book Morfar, Hitler og jeg ("My Grandfather, Hitler, and I"), after discovering by reading the Norwegian Wikipedia article about her grandfather that he was a well-known Nazi activist.

References 

Nazis from outside Germany
Norwegian Waffen-SS personnel
Holocaust perpetrators
Norwegian editors
People from Hjelmeland
People from Lillesand
People convicted of treason for Nazi Germany against Norway
1918 births
2004 deaths